Imperiex is a supervillain appearing in comic books published by DC Comics. He was initially introduced as an adversary to the superhero Superman before becoming a main antagonist for DC Comics' the "Our Worlds at War" crossover.

Publication history

The character first appeared in Superman (vol. 2) #153 (February 2000), and was created by Jeph Loeb and Ed McGuinness. The character is heavily inspired by Galactus from Marvel Comics.

Fictional character biography
The embodiment of entropy, Imperiex takes the form of pure energy contained inside colossal, humanoid armor. Since the dawn of time, he has repeatedly destroyed the universe to create a new one from the ashes of the old. He is first mentioned when Mongul II arrives on Earth stating that Imperiex has destroyed his Warworld and is heading for Earth. Mongul convinces Superman to help him fight Imperiex, and the two apparently manage to defeat it. However, it transpires the "Imperiex" they encountered was nothing more than a probe of Imperiex Prime, the real Imperiex who is a much larger and more powerful being. He has detected imperfections in the fabric of the universe, and his ultimate plan is to destroy it and create a new, perfect one. To do so, Imperiex Prime heads for Earth, the planet which holds the universe together after being the center of the Crisis on Infinite Earths, to destroy it and thereby induce a new Big Bang.

Before arriving on Earth, Imperiex obliterates countless other planets including Kalanor, Karna, and Daxam. After destroying Karna, Imperiex arrives at Almerac, the home of Maxima, and not only destroys Almerac but "hollows" the whole galaxy, as one of the other whole galaxies that are also targeted for demolition. After this, the survivors of the dead worlds, along with Earth, Apokolips and Brainiac 13's new Warworld, form a coalition, with Darkseid as its commander, to fight Imperiex Prime and his probes, which are created by Imperiex's ship. Finally arriving at the Milky Way Galaxy, Imperiex sends in numerous probes, which are revealed to be machine-colony "Hollowers". On Earth, these machines destroy Topeka, Kansas, seven other places on Earth's seven continents and Atlantis, when they began to dig into Earth to ready it for Imperiex's final demolition.

President Lex Luthor rallies the super-heroes of Earth, the U.S. military, and other countries, such as Pokolistan, together for the coming battle, but decides that Superman alone does not have enough power to lead the kind of strike force required. He thus arranges for Doomsday to be released from captivity, 'anti-hero' telepath Manchester Black temporarily 'reprogramming' Doomsday's mind so that his traditional hatred for Superman is briefly transferred to the Imperiex probes. Superman and Doomsday fight the probes and manage to destroy several until Imperiex Prime himself is finally drawn to them. Doomsday is outmatched and vaporized, only his skeleton remaining, though Darkseid saves Superman from a similar fate. Thanks to the sacrifices of Strange Visitor and General Rock, Earth's forces manage to crack Imperiex's armor, intending for Darkseid to use Boom tubes to transfer Imperiex's energies back to the galaxies he had destroyed to prevent them from triggering a new big bang. Brainiac-13 appears on the battleground with his Warworld, absorbing the Imperiex energies into it and himself and vowing to use them to rule everything. Superman dives into the sun to acquire a sufficient power boost to oppose Brainiac, but when it is then discovered that Warworld cannot be destroyed without releasing Imperiex and triggering another Big Bang, he has the Martian Manhunter form a telepathic link with other combatants to make a last-minute plan.

With his powers having been weakened following Brainiac's attack, Darkseid uses Tempest as a magical focus for his abilities, empowered by the faith and strength of the Amazons, and focusing his energy through Steel's new 'Entropy Aegis' armor (created on Apokolips from a burned-out Imperiex probe, originally for Superman to wear it). Meanwhile, Lex Luthor activates a temporal displacement weapon on Earth. The weapon's energies are then combined with Darkseid's Apokolips energy to create a temporal boom tube. Using his new power boost, Superman is able to literally push Warworld itself through the boom tube, sending both Imperiex Prime's and Brainiac's consciousnesses back to the Big Bang, destroying both villains through a combined effort while negating any effect they would have had on the present. In his final moments, Imperiex Prime realizes, in an ironic twist, that the imperfection he had detected in the universe was himself.

At least 8 million people on Earth die during the war. The total number dead in the DC Universe is stated to be countless. Several heroes also die, including Maxima, Aquaman, Guy Gardner, Queen Hippolyta, General Sam Lane (Lois Lane's father), and Steel are all presumed dead, but later return alive for different reasons.

Powers and abilities 
Being the embodiment of entropy, Imperiex wields the power of the Big Bang itself, and can project powerful blasts of energy as well as create black holes capable of sucking up entire universes. He also possesses superhuman strength, durability, and speed, and can create smaller probes resembling him.

In other media

Television

Imperiex appears in Legion of Super Heroes, voiced by Phil Morris. This version was originally an alien gladiator who was cybernetically modified until nothing remained of his original self. By the 41st century, he conquered most of the universe and eliminated almost all resistance against him, with a clone of Superman named Kell-El among the forces left to oppose him. After Kell-El travels back in time to the 31st century to gain help from the Legion of Super-Heroes, Imperiex pursues him and manipulates Brainiac 5 into succumbing to the original Brainiac's influence. However, he is subsequently killed by Brainiac, who sees no more use for him.

Miscellaneous
 Imperiex appears in issue #19 of the Injustice: Gods Among Us prequel comic. Sometime after the Regime's fall, he is defeated and thrown into the Phantom Zone by Superman.
 An alternate universe incarnation of Imperiex appears in the Justice League: Gods and Monsters tie-in comic book as the evolved monstrous form of Doctor Psycho.

References

External links
 Superman Site: Imperiex profile
 Great Krypton: Superman #153

DC Comics male supervillains
DC Comics aliens
DC Comics characters who can move at superhuman speeds
DC Comics characters with superhuman strength
DC Comics deities
DC Comics extraterrestrial supervillains
Comics characters introduced in 2000
Fictional mass murderers
Characters created by Jeph Loeb
Superman characters